Motuoapa is a rural settlement northeast of Tūrangi, on the southeast side of New Zealand's Lake Taupō.  runs through it. Motuoapa Peninsula rises to the northwest, with a trig point at 497 metres, and Motuoapa Bay is directly to the north.

A youth hostel opened at Motuoapa in 1955 and a marina was built in 1961.

Demographics
The settlement is part of the larger Lake Taupo Bays statistical area.

Motuoapa had a population of 360 at the 2018 New Zealand census, an increase of 123 people (51.9%) since the 2013 census, and an increase of 132 people (57.9%) since the 2006 census. There were 159 households, comprising 171 males and 189 females, giving a sex ratio of 0.9 males per female, with 39 people (10.8%) aged under 15 years, 21 (5.8%) aged 15 to 29, 174 (48.3%) aged 30 to 64, and 129 (35.8%) aged 65 or older.

Ethnicities were 85.0% European/Pākehā, 20.8% Māori, 0.8% Pacific peoples, 3.3% Asian, and 3.3% other ethnicities. People may identify with more than one ethnicity.

Although some people chose not to answer the census's question about religious affiliation, 51.7% had no religion, 39.2% were Christian, 0.8% had Māori religious beliefs and 0.8% had other religions.

Of those at least 15 years old, 66 (20.6%) people had a bachelor's or higher degree, and 63 (19.6%) people had no formal qualifications. 48 people (15.0%) earned over $70,000 compared to 17.2% nationally. The employment status of those at least 15 was that 120 (37.4%) people were employed full-time, 54 (16.8%) were part-time, and 6 (1.9%) were unemployed.

References

Taupō District
Populated places in Waikato
Populated places on Lake Taupō